The Oceanside Pier, located in Oceanside, in northern San Diego County, California, is the longest wooden pier on the western United States coastline at .

History
The pier was first built in 1888 at what is now Wisconsin Avenue. The original pier was destroyed by storms in the winter of 1890, and was rebuilt in 1893 by Melchoir Pieper at what is now Pier View Way, where all subsequent piers would be located. Four iterations of the pier were built and then destroyed by heavy storms. The current pier was built and formally opened to the public in September 1987, at a cost of $5 million.

At the foot of the pier is the Junior Seau Pier Amphitheatre, which hosts numerous events throughout the year. The Junior Seau Beach Community Center, also known as the Beach Recreation Center, is a  facility located near the pier that includes a gymnasium, meeting room, stage, and kitchen. Both the amphitheater and the community center were renamed posthumously in 2012 in honor of hometown football hero Junior Seau.

Activities
Now in its sixth incarnation (built in 1987), the pier is a popular fishing spot, and Ruby's Diner, a 1950s style diner, was located at the end of the pier from 1996 to 2021. Surfing is also very popular on both the North and South sides of the pier.

Parking
Pre-pay parking is available along Mission Ave, N. Pacific St, N. Myers, and as well as on N. Cleveland St. Metered parking is also available on Pier View Way. Parking regulations are very strict in Oceanside, especially near the pier and the harbor.

Additional Images

References

External links

Oceanside Historical Society: The Oceanside Pier History
Oceanside.com - The Pier at Oceanside

Piers in California
Parks in San Diego County, California
Tourist attractions in San Diego
Oceanside, California
Transportation buildings and structures in San Diego County, California
1888 establishments in California